Master Patrick of Ireland, Irish writer, fl.14th century?

Author of 'Sophisma determinatum',  which exists only in two 14th-century copies, one at the Bavarian State Library, Munich, the second at the University Library, Basel. All that is known for certain of Patrick is that he was a Paris master.

Sources

 A New History of Ireland, volume one, p. 668.

14th-century Latin writers
Year of birth missing
Year of death missing
14th-century Irish writers
Irish expatriates in France
Irish male writers
Irish Latinists